Robustiano Bilbao Echevarría (born 29 November 1897, date of death unknown) was a Spanish footballer. He competed in the men's tournament at the 1928 Summer Olympics.

References

External links
 
 

1897 births
Year of death missing
Spanish footballers
Spain international footballers
Olympic footballers of Spain
Footballers at the 1928 Summer Olympics
Footballers from Getxo
Association football forwards
Arenas Club de Getxo footballers